Singles '96 - '06 is an anthology of the Belgian band Hooverphonic's singles. It compiles single versions of tracks from all of the band's previous albums. Two-disc editions include a DVD collecting all the corresponding music videos and a complete concert.

Track listing
Disc 1 - CD
 "Inhaler"
 "Wardrope"
 "2Wicky"
 "Barabas"
 "Club Montepulciano"
 "Eden"
 "This Strange Effect"
 "Jackie Cane"
 "Mad About You"
 "Out of Sight" (Al Stone Mix)
 "Vinegar & Salt"
 "Sometimes"
 "The World Is Mine"
 "One"
 "The Last Thing I Need Is You"
 "Wake Up"
 "You Hurt Me"
 "We All Float"
 "Dirty Lenses" (Remixed by Alex Callier)
 "Lung" (Happy Go Disco Remix)

Disc 2 - DVD
 "Inhaler"
 "2Wicky"
 "Club Montepulciano"
 "Eden"
 "This Strange Effect"
 "Jackie Cane"
 "Mad About You"
 "Out of Sight"
 "Vinegar & Salt"
 "Sometimes"
 "The World Is Mine"
 "One"
 "The Last Thing I Need Is You"
 "Wake Up"
 "You Hurt Me"
 "Dirty Lenses"
 + 90 minutes concert “Live @ the AB”

Charts

Weekly charts

Year-end charts

Certifications

References

2006 greatest hits albums
Hooverphonic albums
2006 video albums
Music video compilation albums